"What If She's an Angel" is a song written by Bryan Wayne and recorded by American country music artist Tommy Shane Steiner.  It was released as Steiner's debut single in December 2001 from his debut album Then Came the Night. The song reached No. 2 on the Billboard Hot Country Singles & Tracks chart in May 2002, becoming his only hit single. On the Billboard Hot 100, it peaked at No. 39.

Chart performance
"What If She's an Angel" debuted at number 52 on the U.S. Billboard Hot Country Singles & Tracks for the week of December 22, 2001.

Year-end charts

References

Tommy Shane Steiner songs
2001 debut singles
2001 songs
RCA Records singles